Jordan Arley Parra Arias (born 19 April 1994) is a Colombian road and track cyclist, who currently rides for Colombian amateur team Soñando Colombia. He competed in the scratch event at the 2014 UCI Track Cycling World Championships.

Major results

2015
 6th GP Adria Mobil
2018
 1st Stage 6 Tour of Taihu Lake
2019
 9th Grand Prix de la Somme

References

External links
 
 

1994 births
Living people
Colombian track cyclists
Colombian male cyclists
Sportspeople from Bogotá
Pan American Games medalists in cycling
Pan American Games silver medalists for Colombia
Cyclists at the 2019 Pan American Games
Medalists at the 2019 Pan American Games
20th-century Colombian people
21st-century Colombian people
Competitors at the 2014 Central American and Caribbean Games